The 2016–17 season was Associazione Calcio Milan's 83rd season in Serie A and 34th consecutive season in the top flight of Italian football. Milan competed in Serie A, the Supercoppa Italiana (as finalist of 2015–16 Coppa Italia) and the Coppa Italia.

Players

Squad information

Source

Transfers

Summer window

In

On loan

Loan returns

Total spending:  €26M

Out

Loans ended

Out on loan

Total income:  €14,500,000
Net income:  €11,500,000

Winter window

In

On loan

Loan returns

Total spending:  €0,75 M

Out

Out on loan

Total income:  €500,000
Net income:  €250,000

Pre-season and friendlies

Competitions

Overall

Last updated: 28 May 2017

Serie A

League table

Results summary

Results by round

Matches

Coppa Italia

Supercoppa Italiana

Statistics

Appearances and goals

|-
! colspan=14 style=background:#dcdcdc; text-align:center| Goalkeepers

|-
! colspan=14 style=background:#dcdcdc; text-align:center| Defenders

|-
! colspan=14 style=background:#dcdcdc; text-align:center| Midfielders

|-
! colspan=14 style=background:#dcdcdc; text-align:center| Forwards

|-
! colspan=14 style=background:#dcdcdc; text-align:center| Players transferred out during the season

|-
! colspan=14 style=background:#dcdcdc; text-align:center| Other

Goalscorers
In italics players that left the team during the season.

Last updated: 28 May 2017

Clean sheets

Last updated: 28 May 2017

Disciplinary record

Includes all competitive matches. Players listed below made at least one appearance for A.C. Milan first squad during the season.

References

A.C. Milan seasons
Milan